
Chasséen culture is the name given to the archaeological culture of prehistoric France of the late Neolithic, which dates to roughly between 4500 BC and 3500 BC. The name "Chasséen" derives from the type site near Chassey-le-Camp (Saône-et-Loire).

Chasséen culture spread throughout the plains and plateaux of France, including the Seine basin and the upper Loire valleys, and extended to the present-day départments of Haute-Saône, Vaucluse, Alpes-de-Haute-Provence, Pas-de-Calais, and Eure-et-Loir. Excavations at Bercy (in Paris) have revealed a Chasséen village (4000 BC - 3800BC) on the right bank of the Seine; artifacts include wood canoes, pottery, bows and arrows, wood and stone tools.

Chasséens were sedentary farmers (rye, panic grass, millet, apples, pears, prunes) and herders (sheep, goats, oxen, pigs). They lived in huts organized into small villages (100-400 people). Their pottery was little decorated. They had no metal technology (which appeared later) but mastered the use of flint.

By roughly 3500 BC, the Chasséen culture in France gave way to the late Neolithic transitional Seine-Oise-Marne culture (3100BC - 2000 BC) in Northern France and to a series of archaeological cultures in Southern France.

Time line

4000: Chasséen village of Bercy near Paris
4400: Chasséen village of Saint-Michel du Touch near Toulouse.
4400: Appearance of Rössen culture at Baume de Gonvillars in Haute-Saône.
3190: Chasséen culture in Calvados.
3530: Chasséen culture in Pas-de-Calais.
3450: End of Chasséen culture in Eure-et-Loir.
3400: End of Chasséen culture in Saint-Mitre (Alpes-de-Haute-Provence).

Gallery

Notes

See also
Neolithic France
Cortaillod culture
Chasséen-Lagozza-Cortaillod culture
Rössen culture (4500 BC - 4000 BC)
Funnelbeaker culture (4000 BC -2700 BC)
Véraza culture (3400/3300 BC - 2700/2600 BC)
Seine-Oise-Marne culture (3100BC - 2000 BC)
Beaker culture (2800 BC - 1900 BC)

Archaeological cultures of Western Europe
Neolithic cultures of Europe
Archaeological cultures in France